Maria (March 4, 1945 − May 10, 1980) was a musician who had a number of hits in South Africa.

Her baptismal name is Carmélia Maria Neto Lopes, was born in Lourenço Marques (today Maputo) in Mozambique, then a prosperous Portuguese colony in southeastern Africa, on March 4, 1945. Her mother, of Portuguese origin, sang and even performed at RCM, . At the age of two, her family moved to Johannesburg, South Africa.

Maria began to show interest in music, and led private and school parties. In 1964, she started performing professionally in night clubs in Johannesburg, at the time known as the New York of Africa. Her crystal clear and tuned voice, as well as his beautiful figure and presence on stage, attract attention. Guitarist Archie van Der Ploeg, after listening to her, invited her to sing in his band. Archie was a very active self-taught musician in the city, and he would later become a well-known painter. Stevie van Kerken, lead singer of "The New Trends", was looking for a voice to record in the choir of a Dickie Loader song, "Help me Forget" and Archie indicates Maria. After the record started playing on the radio, phone calls poured in to find out who the chorus was. Maria's launch was done.

Columbia immediately invites her to record a disc. "This is Maria" is her first album and came out in 1968. It contains songs like the country classic "Right or Wrong", "You" or "Gipsy Dreams".

Her second LP comes out in late 1968 and is called "Goodbye Jimmy Goodbye".

Maria became the musical sensation of South Africa in the late 1960s, and performed at several nightclubs in Hillbrow, the chic district of Johannesburg, such as the Lourenço Marques Restaurant, Archie Club and becomes an attraction at the Top of Carlton, one of the most famous and trendy five-star hotels in the world, where international celebrities such as Henry Kissinger and famous artists such as Mick Jagger and Michael Jackson stayed. She made tournaments and shows sponsored by South African Airways. In 1973 she released the single "I'm on Fire" and her voice reached distant countries, such as the United Kingdom, Germany and Sweden. In Brazil the song was part of the LP Premier Mundial 2001 (1), one of the most sold in the country in the year 1973. The single "Clap your hands and clap your feet", in the wave of the glam-rock beat, reaches the first place of the Hit-Parade by Springbok Radio, in August 1973, and remained in the top 20 for 17 weeks. In 1974 Maria wins a SARIE as the best artist of the year. In 1974 she released "Hurry On Home" and in 1976 "Stand Up Like A Man". Maria's other albums are "New Country Sounds", produced by Archie Van Der Ploeg, and "Portrait Of Maria", a compilation of singles and new songs recorded by her in the 70s.

Little is known about Maria's private life. With the end of apartheid in South Africa, white artists entered a process of oblivion, and the few data available are selected through comments from family members on social networks and YouTube. It is known that he had two daughters and currently has two granddaughters. Maria died prematurely, at the age of 35 (breast cancer), on May 10, 1980, in Johannesburg. She was cremated and her ashes were scattered through the Wilds (Municipal Natural Reserve of Wilds) where, according to family members, she was going to meditate after musical performances.

She reached No 1 on the Springbok Top 20 chart in 1973 with a cover of Clap Your Hands And Stamp Your Feet.

She won a SARIE award for Top 20 Artist of the Year in 1974.

Discography

Singles
 I'm on Fire (1973)
 Clap Your Hands And Stamp Your Feet (1973)
 Hurry on Home (1974)
 Stand up like a man (1971)

References

1980 deaths
1945 births
20th-century South African women singers